Code page 855 (CCSID 855) (also known as CP 855, IBM 00855, OEM 855, MS-DOS Cyrillic) is a code page used under DOS to write Cyrillic script.

Code page 872 (CCSID 872) is the euro currency update of code page/CCSID 855. Byte CF replaces ¤ with € in that code page.

It supports the repertoires of ISO-8859-5 and ISO-IR-111 (in a different arrangement), in addition to preserving the semigraphic and box-drawing characters and guillemets from code page 850.

At one time it was widely used in Serbia, Macedonia and Bulgaria, but it never caught on in Russia, where Code page 866 was more common. This code page is not used much.

Character set
The following table shows code page 855. Each character is shown with its equivalent Unicode code point. Only the second half of the table (code points 128–255) is shown, the first half (code points 0–127) being the same as code page 437.

References

855